Love Is Love is a compilation album by Elkie Brooks, compiled in 1994 and released in the same year on CD and cassette by Castle Records.

Track listing 
"Sail On"
"Don’t Wanna Cry No More"
"Break the Chain"
"Love is Love"
"Kiss Me for the Last Time"
"All Or Nothing"
"Only Love Will Set You Free"
"When The Hero Walks Alone"
"Blue Jay"
"No Secrets Call of the Wild"
"You Ain't Leavin'"
"What's the Matter Baby"
"Hiding Inside Yourself"
"Can't Wait All Night"

References

Elkie Brooks albums
1994 compilation albums